Wee Jasper is a  hamlet in the Goodradigbee valley at the western foot of the Brindabella Ranges, near Burrinjuck Dam in New South Wales, Australia in Yass Valley Shire. It is located about 90 km north-west of Canberra and 60 km south-west of Yass.

History and description

The place now known as Wee Jasper and the surrounding area of the Goodradigbee River valley lie on the traditional lands of the Ngunnawal people. The area lay outside the Nineteen Counties, in which the colonial government allowed colonial settlement; the County of Buccleuch and the neighbouring County of Cowley were not proclaimed, until 31 December 1848.

The origin of the name Wee Jasper is unknown. It has been in use since at latest 1848, when it appeared as a single-word name 'Weejasper'.  Although both 'Weejasper' and 'Wee Jasper' were used subsequently, it was not until 1970 that the village's name changed officially from 'Weejasper' to Wee Jasper. The name is possibly of Aboriginal origin. 

The Hume and Hovell expedition passed through the area in October 1824.  

Colonial settlement in the area dates from 1831, when a land grant at 'Cooradigbee' was made. It was one of the last free land grants in the colony of New South Wales, and it was only granted because it already had been promised by Governor Darling, in October 1830. On 9 January 1831, Viscount Goderich instructed that no more free grants, except those already promised, be given. All land thereafter was to be sold at public auction. The land grant extinguished what would later—in 1992—become known as native title over the land, effectively dispossessing the traditional owners.

There was a site for a village, to be known as Goodradigbee, proclaimed in 1866, but its design was cancelled in 1900. The cluster of settlement instead developed, further upstream on the river, nearer to the eventual site of the bridge, at what is now the village of Wee Jasper.

'Coodra Vale', a property close to Wee Jasper of 40,000 acres (16,188 ha), was the home of pastoralist, Stewart Ryrie, Junior, from 1871 until his death in 1882. From 1908 to 1912, 'Coodra Vale' was the home of renowned Australian bush-poet, A.B. 'Banjo' Paterson; his poem, A Mountain Station, was informed by the time he spent there as an agriculturalist.

South of the village is the confluence of the Goodradigbee and its tributary, Wee Jasper Creek. Gold was found and mined along this creek, in the 1890s, when it was known as 'The Wee Jasper'. The Goodradigbee Goldfield, which included the area, was proclaimed in 1882, but was revoked in 1897. Although mining took place, the area was not a significant mining area. 

The bridge across the Goodradigbee River, at Wee Jasper, opened in September 1896, providing a better connection from the area to Yass and Tumut. The filling of the Burrinjuck Dam, during the 1920s, resulted in the inundation of part of the valley, downstream from the village. More land was inundated later, when the dam wall was raised.

Wee Jasper had a police station by 1887. Wee Jasper Post Office was first opened in January 1886 and closed in March 1892. Three years later, it was reopened again and remained in service until 1994. There is a school at Wee Jasper, which opened as a provisional school in 1899 and achieved public school status in 1918. Wee Jasper had a Catholic church, now repurposed.

Near the village are several camping and recreation reserves close to numerous caves. The best known cave is Carey's Cave, a system of seven caverns lying just north of the town. Others lie to the north and south, including Dip, Dogleg, Punch-bowl and Signature Caves.

Fossils, including members of the Acanthothoracid placoderm fish family Weejasperaspididae, the primitive placoderm Brindabellaspis stensioi and the prehistoric lungfish, Dipnorhynchus cathlesae, have been found in the area.

Heritage listings
Wee Jasper has a number of heritage-listed sites, including:
 278 Main Road: Wee Jasper Bridge over Goodradigbee River

Gallery

Climate

Wee Jasper has an identical climate to that of Batlow; comprising warm, stormy summers and cold, very wet winters with moderate to heavy snowfalls.

Maximum temperatures are significantly cooler than regions of similar altitude in the Australian Capital Territory, owing to its windward position on the western slopes of the Brindabella Range.

References

Towns in New South Wales
Southern Tablelands
Yass Valley Council